A&M Consolidated High School, also known as "Consol", is a public high school located in the city of College Station, Texas, United States. It is classified as a 5A school by the UIL. The school is part of the College Station Independent School District located in southern Brazos County. In 2015, the school was rated "Met Standard" by the Texas Education Agency. Until the opening of College Station High School in 2012, A&M Consolidated was the only high school in College Station; the two schools are now crosstown rivals.

Athletics
The A&M Consolidated Tigers compete in these sports:

Baseball
Basketball
Cross Country
Football
Golf
Gymnastics
Powerlifting
Soccer
Softball
Swimming and Diving
Track and Field
Tennis
Volleyball 
Wrestling

State titles
Boys' Cross Country -
1974(B), 1975(B), 1976(B), 1977(B), 1988(B), 1982(4A), 1984(4A), 1992(4A)
Girls' Cross Country -
1980(4A), 1983(4A), 1984(4A)
Football -
1991(4A)
Boys' Golf -
1969(3A)
Boys’ Tennis -
2019, 2021 (5A doubles)

Academics
Academic UIL State Meet Overall Champions
 1997(5A), 2005(5A), 2006(5A)
Current Issues and Events
2000(5A), 2002(5A), 2003(5A), 2005(5A), 2013-2017(5A), 2019(5A)
Mathematics
1994(4A), 1995(5A), 1996(5A), 1997(5A), 2006(5A)
Social Studies
2004(5A), 2006(5A)
One Act Play
1957(1A), 1962(2A), 1963(2A)
National Science Bowl Top 4
2000, 2003, 2004
BEST Robotics State Championship Qualifier
1997-2015, 2017-2019

Rivalries

A&M Consolidated has two main rivals: College Station High School and Bryan High School. The rivalry with College Station High is due to the two schools being the only two public high schools that sponsor UIL athletics teams in the city of College Station (College View High does not offer UIL athletics).  Bryan High has long been a rival of A&M Consolidated, as the two were, for many years, the only two high schools in the Twin Cities: Bryan and College Station. The rivalry between them is called the "Crosstown Showdown".

Notable alumni

Dana Branham, Pulitzer Prize Winning Journalist
Matthew Berry, ESPN Sports Analyst
Patience Reading, ADC neurologist
Brianna Hildebrand, actress
Thomas Sadoski, Actor
Alex Caruso, NBA player
Red Cashion, NFL Head Referee, retired 
Bill Blakeley, basketball coach
Chris Cralle, Olympic athlete
Casey Grice, LPGA professional golfer
Matt Langwell, Former MLB baseball pitcher
David Nixon (American football), former NFL linebacker
Jocelyn McCauley (Triathlete), 2017 Ironman New Zealand Winner
Eagle Pennell, filmmaker 
Neil Sperry, horticulturalist 
Troy Walters, former NFL wide receiver
Kip Corrington, former NFL defensive back
Clif Groce, former NFL running back
Emily Pulley, opera singer
Tiffany Thornton, actress
Larry Fedora, Former Head football coach, University of North Carolina
 Marcus Moore, ABC News Correspondent
Sasha Cooke, Grammy Award-winning opera singer
 Howie Liu, Co-founder and CEO of Airtable
Alok Vaid-Menon, writer
Zeta Morrison, winner of Love Island USA season 4

References

External links

College Station ISD
A&M Consolidated Tiger Club

Public high schools in Texas
High schools in Brazos County, Texas
1920 establishments in Texas
Educational institutions established in 1920